Assumption is an unincorporated community in Adams County, Nebraska, United States.

History
A colony of German Catholics settled near Assumption circa 1873. The name Assumption is derived from the Church of the Assumption of the Blessed Virgin Mary, established in the 1880s.

Notes

Unincorporated communities in Adams County, Nebraska
Unincorporated communities in Nebraska